Boonton Radio Corporation, founded in 1934, manufactured test instruments.

History

Early history 
The company was founded in 1934 by William D. Loughlin and others in Boonton, New Jersey.  The company developed and manufactured many innovative instruments, the most significant (and earliest) being the Q meter.  The instruments they developed were mostly used for measuring for radio technology.

Hewlett-Packard 
In 1959, Hewlett-Packard purchased Boonton Radio Corporation as a "wholly owned subsidiary" and continued to sell a number of its products, including the RX meter. Boonton Radio Corporation was the second acquisition HP made.

References 

Electronic test equipment manufacturers
Manufacturing companies based in New Jersey
Electronics companies established in 1934
American companies established in 1934
1934 establishments in New Jersey